Kaito Sakaguchi (坂口魁斗, born 28 August 2001), popularly known as Kaito (魁斗), is a Japanese kickboxer, currently competing in the super featherweight division of RISE.

As of August 2021 he was the #9 ranked Super Flyweight kickboxer in the world by Combat Press.

Kickboxing career

Shootboxing
Kaito made his professional debut against Yu Jin at Shoot Boxing OSAKA 2018 ALPINISME vol.1 on March 18, 2018. He won the fight by unanimous decision, with scores of 30–27, 30–28 and 30–29.

Kaito was scheduled to face Satoru Shimizu at Shoot Boxing 2018 act.3 on June 10, 2018. He won the fight by unanimous decision, with scores of 30–28, 30–28 and 30–29.

Kaito was scheduled to face Bullseye Ryuta at Shoot Boxing 2018 Young Caesar Cup Central #23 on September 23, 2018. He won the fight by a third-round technical knockout.

Kaito was scheduled to face Shota Tezuka at Shoot Boxing S-Cup World Tournament 2018 on November 18, 2018. He won the fight by unanimous decision, with scores of 30–28, 30–27 and 30–27.

Kaito was scheduled to face Kazuya Ueda at Shoot Boxing 2018 Young Caesar Cup act.5 on December 16, 2018, in his fifth and final fight of 2018. He won the fight by unanimous decision, with all three judges scoring the bout 30–29 in his favor.

Kaito was scheduled to fight Genki at Shoot Boxing Osaka 2019 Alpinisme vol.1 on August 10, 2019. He won the fight by unanimous decision, with two judges awarding him a 30–29 scorecard, while the third judge scored the fight 30–28 in his favor.

Kaito was scheduled to face the #4 ranked featherweight contender Shota Tezuka at Shoot Boxing 2019 act.4 on September 28, 2019. He won the fight by unanimous decision, with scores of 29–28, 30–28 and 30–27.

Kaito was scheduled to face the #10 ranked featherweight contender TSUTOMU at Shoot Boxing Hanayashiki Extreme.3 on October 27, 2019. He won the fight by unanimous decision, with scores of 30–28, 30–28 and 30–27.

Kaito was next scheduled to fight the #1 ranked Shootboxing featherweight contender Yuki Kasahara at Shoot Boxing 2020 act.1 on February 15, 2020. The fight was ruled a majority draw after the first three rounds, with two of the judges seeing the fight as a draw (30–30 and 29–29), while the third judge scored the fight 30–29 for Kasahara. Accordingly, an extension round was fought and was once again ruled a majority draw, with one judge scoring the round for Kasahara. Kasahara was awarded a majority decision, after a second extension round was fought.

Move up to super featherweight
Following his first professional loss, Kaito moved up to super featherweight, a 2.5kg increase in weight from his previous fights. He was scheduled to face Shoki Kaneda for the RKS Super Featherweight title at RKS GOLD RUSH VII on November 29, 2020. Kaito won the fight by majority decision.

Kaito was next scheduled to face Takuya Taira, in a 58.5kg bout, at HOOST CUP KINGS KYOTO 7 on March 7, 2021. He won the fight by unanimous decision, with scores of 29–28, 30–27 and 30–27.

Kaito took part in the DEEP KICK super featherweight tournament held at DEEP☆KICK 51 on April 11, 2021, and was scheduled to face Taiki Sawatani in the semifinals. The fight was ruled a majority draw after the first three rounds, with two judges scoring it as a 29–29 draw, while the third judge scored it 29–28 for Sawatani. Sawatani was awarded a majority decision, after an extension round was fought.

RISE
Kaito was scheduled to make his promotional debut with RISE against Keisuke Monguchi at Rise World Series 2021 on July 18, 2021. He won the fight by split decision, with scores of 30–29, 30–29 and 29–30.

Kaito was scheduled to challenge Takuya Taira for the HOOST CUP Japan Featherweight title at HOOST CUP KINGS KYOTO 8 on October 17, 2021. He won the fight by unanimous decision after five rounds.

Sakaguchi faced Kyo Kawakami for the vacant Shoot Boxing Japan Featherweight title at Shoot Boxing 2022 act.2 on April 10, 2022. He lost the fight by majority decision, after an extra round was contested.

Sakaguchi faced the former RISE Featherweight champion Taisei Umei at RISE 165 on February 23, 2023. He won the fight by majority decision, with two scorecards of 30–29 and one even scorecard of 29–29.

Titles and accomplishments

Professional
Real Kakutou Spirits
 2020 RKS Super Featherweight Champion 
HOOST CUP
 2021 Hoost Cup Japan Featherweight Champion

Amateur
All Japan Glove Karate Federation
2008 Glove Karate Federation All Japan Elementary School Champion 
2012 Glove Karate Federation All Japan Elementary School Champion 
2013 Glove Karate Federation All Japan Elementary School Champion
2014 Glove Karate Federation All Japan middle school Runner-up
2015 Glove Karate Federation All Japan middle school Runner-up 
2017 Glove Karate Federation All Japan -60kg Champion  
DEEP KICK
2013 TOP RUN -40kg Champion 
2014 All Japan Jr Kick -40kg Runner-up 
Shootboxing
2013 Shoot Boxing All Japan Junior -40kg Champion
2015 Shoot Boxing All Kansai Junior -50kg Champion
2016 Shoot Boxing All Japan -55kg Champion
2017 Shoot Boxing All Japan -60kg Champion

Fight record

Professional

|-  style="background:#cfc;"
| 2023-02-23 || Win ||align=left| Taisei Umei || RISE 165 || Tokyo, Japan || Decision (Majority) || 3 || 3:00
|-
|-  style="background:#fbb;"
| 2022-04-10|| Loss || align=left| Kyo Kawakami || Shoot Boxing 2022 act.2|| Tokyo, Japan || Ext.R Decision (Majority)  ||6 ||3:00
|-
! style=background:white colspan=9 |
|-  style="background:#cfc;"
| 2021-10-17|| Win || align=left| Takuya Taira || HOOST CUP KINGS KYOTO 8|| Kyoto, Japan || Decision (Unanimous)  || 5|| 3:00 
|-
! style=background:white colspan=9 |
|-  style="background:#cfc;"
| 2021-07-18||Win ||align=left| Keisuke Monguchi || RISE WORLD SERIES 2021 Osaka || Osaka, Japan || Decision (Split) ||3  ||3:00
|-  style="background:#fbb;"
| 2021-04-11|| Loss ||align=left| Taiki Sawatani || DEEP☆KICK 51, -60kg Championship Tournament Semi Final || Osaka, Japan || Ext.R Decision (Split)  || 4 || 3:00
|-  style="background:#cfc;"
| 2021-03-07|| Win ||align=left| Takuya Taira || HOOST CUP KINGS KYOTO 7  || Kyoto, Japan || Decision (Unanimous)  || 3 || 3:00
|-  style="background:#cfc;"
| 2020-11-29|| Win || align=left| Shoki Kaneda || RKS GOLD RUSH VII|| Osaka, Japan || Decision (Majority)  ||3 || 3:00 
|-
! style=background:white colspan=9 |
|-  bgcolor="#fbb"
| 2020-02-15|| Loss ||align=left| Yuki Kasahara ||Shoot Boxing 2020 act.1|| Tokyo, Japan || 2nd Ext.R Decision (Majority) || 5|| 3:00
|-  bgcolor="#cfc"
| 2019-10-27|| Win||align=left| TSUTOMU || Shoot Boxing Hanayashiki Extreme.3 || Tokyo, Japan || Decision (Unanimous) || 3|| 3:00
|-  bgcolor="#cfc"
| 2019-09-28|| Win||align=left| Shota Tezuka || Shoot Boxing 2019 act.4|| Tokyo, Japan || Decision (Unanimous) || 3|| 3:00
|-  bgcolor="#cfc"
| 2019-08-10|| Win||align=left| Genki || Shoot Boxing Osaka 2019 Alpinisme vol.1|| Osaka, Japan || Decision (Unanimous) || 3|| 3:00
|-  bgcolor="#cfc"
| 2018-12-16|| Win||align=left| Kazuya Ueda || Shoot Boxing 2018 Young Caesar Cup act.5 || Tokyo, Japan || Decision (Unanimous) || 3|| 3:00
|-  bgcolor="#cfc"
| 2018-11-18|| Win||align=left| Shota Tezuka || Shoot Boxing S-Cup World Tournament 2018 || Tokyo, Japan || Decision (Unanimous) || 3|| 3:00
|-  bgcolor="#cfc"
| 2018-09-23|| Win||align=left| Bullseye Ryuta|| Shoot Boxing 2018 Young Caesar Cup Central #23 || Aichi, Japan || TKO (Corner Stoppage) || 3|| 1:07
|-  bgcolor="#cfc"
| 2018-06-10|| Win||align=left| Satoru Shimizu || Shoot Boxing 2018 act.3 || Tokyo, Japan || Decision (Unanimous) || 3|| 2:00
|-  bgcolor="#cfc"
| 2018-03-18|| Win||align=left| Yu Jin|| Shoot Boxing OSAKA 2018 ALPINISME vol.1 || Osaka, Japan || Decision (Unanimous) || 3|| 2:00
|-
| colspan=9 | Legend:

Amateur

|-  bgcolor="#cfc"
| 2017-12-17|| Win||align=left| Shota Tezuka || All Japan Amateur Shoot Boxing || Tokyo, Japan || Decision  ||  || 
|-
! style=background:white colspan=9 |
|-  bgcolor="#cfc"
| 2017-10-29|| Win ||align=left| Tadahiko Tsushima ||Amateur Shoot Boxing Kansai || Osaka, Japan || Decision (Unanimous) || 2 || 2:00
|-  bgcolor="#cfc"
| 2017-06-25|| Win ||align=left| Kohei Nagaoka ||Amateur Shoot Boxing Kansai || Osaka, Japan || Decision (Unanimous) || 2 || 2:00

|-  style="background:#c5d2ea;"
| 2017-04-30|| No Contest||align=left| Koki Ueno || NEXT LEVEL Kansai 38 || Osaka, Japan || (Doctor Stop/Head clash) || 1 ||
|-  style="text-align:center; background:#cfc;"
| 2017-03-05|| Win||align=left| Haru Furumiya || AJGKF XIII || Osaka, Japan || Decision (Unanimous) ||  || 

|-  bgcolor="#cfc"
| 2016-12-18|| Win||align=left| Masahito Okuyama||All Japan Amateur Shoot Boxing  || Osaka, Japan || Decision (Unanimous) || 2 || 2:00
|-
! style=background:white colspan=9 |
|-  bgcolor="#cfc"
| 2016-09-25|| Win||align=left| Ryouga Yoshiharu ||All Japan Amateur Shoot Boxing West Japan Selection || Osaka, Japan || Decision (Unanimous) || 2 || 2:00
|-  bgcolor="#cfc"
| 2016-08-13|| Win||align=left| Fumito Ando ||SHOOT BOXING OSAKA 2016 "ALPINISME vol.1" || Osaka, Japan || Decision (Unanimous) || 2 || 2:00
|-  bgcolor="#fbb"
| 2016-01-24|| Loss||align=left| Yuki Kasahara ||All Japan Shoot Boxing Amateur || Tokyo, Japan || Decision (Unanimous) || 2 || 2:00
|-
! style=background:white colspan=9 |
|-  bgcolor="#fbb"
| 2015-10-03|| Loss ||align=left| Ayumu Mita ||SHOOT BOXING THE LAST BOMB ||  Japan || Ext.R Decision (Split) || 3 || 2:00
|-  bgcolor="#cfc"
| 2015-09-06|| Win||align=left| Tomoya Nishida ||Shoot Boxing Amateur Kansai || Osaka, Japan || Ext.R Decision (Split) || 3 || 2:00
|-  style="background:#;"
| 2015-03-15|| ||align=left|  || 4th All Japan Jr. Kick -45kg, Quarter Final || Tokyo, Japan || Decision ||  ||
|-  bgcolor="#cfc"
| 2014-11-09|| Win||align=left| Aoi Takahashi ||Shoot Boxing Amateur Kansai || Osaka, Japan || Decision (Majority) || 2 || 2:00
|-  bgcolor="#fbb"
| 2014-09-28|| Loss ||align=left| Shogo Tanaka || DEEP KICK 22 || Osaka, Japan || Decision (Majority) || 3 || 2:00
|-
! style=background:white colspan=9 |
|-  bgcolor="#cfc"
| 2014-06-29|| Win||align=left| Ruki Kawamura ||Amateur Shoot Boxing Kansai || Osaka, Japan || Decision (Majority) || 2 || 2:00
|-  bgcolor="#cfc"
| 2014-06-15|| Win||align=left| Haruhi Tokunaga ||NEXT LEVEL Kansai 15 || Sakai, Japan || Decision (Unanimous) || 2 || 2:00
|-  style="background:#fbb;"
| 2014-03-30|| Loss ||align=left| Haruto Yasumoto || 3rd All Japan Jr. Kick -40kg, Final || Tokyo, Japan || Decision ||  || 
|-
! style=background:white colspan=9 |
|-  style="background:#cfc;"
| 2014-03-30|| Win||align=left|  || 3rd All Japan Jr. Kick -40kg, Semi Final || Tokyo, Japan || Decision ||  ||

|-  style="background:#cfc;"
| 2014-02-23|| Win ||align=left| Naoki Nagano || DEEP KICK 19 || Osaka, Japan || Decision (Unanimous) || 3 || 2:00 
|-
! style=background:white colspan=9 |

|-  bgcolor="#cfc"
| 2014-02-16|| Win||align=left| Aoi Takahashi ||Shoot Boxing Amateur Kansai || Osaka, Japan || Decision (Unanimous) || 2 || 2:00
|-  bgcolor="#cfc"
| 2014-02-11|| Win||align=left| Naoki Nagano ||Double Impact IV – All Japan Jr Kick Kansai Selection || Osaka, Japan || Ext.R Decision (Unanimous) || ||
|- style="background:#cfc;"
| 2013-11-16|| Win || align="left" | Haruto Yasumoto ||Shoot Boxing GROUND ZERO TOKYO 2013||Tokyo, Japan|| Decision (Majority) || 2 || 2:00
|-
! style=background:white colspan=9 |
|-  bgcolor="#cfc"
| 2013-10-14|| Win||align=left| Taichi Isogai ||Shoot Boxing West Japan Selection|| Osaka, Japan || Decision (Split) || 2 ||
|-  style="background:#cfc;"
| 2013-09-22|| Win ||align=left| Yosuke Sekimoto || DEEP KICK 17 || Osaka, Japan || Ext.R Decision (Split) || 4 || 2:00 
|-
! style=background:white colspan=9 |
|-  bgcolor="#cfc"
| 2013-09-01|| Win||align=left| Naoki Nagano ||NEXT LEVEL Kansai 9 || Higashiōsaka, Japan || Ext.R Decision (Unanimous) || 2 || 2:00
|-  bgcolor="#cfc"
| 2013-07-07|| Win||align=left| Naoki Nagano ||NEXT LEVEL Kansai 8 || Sakai, Japan || Decision (Unanimous) || 2 || 2:00
|-  bgcolor="#cfc"
| 2013-06-15|| Win ||align=left| Ayumu Mita ||Shoot Boxing Amateur Kansai || Kansai, Japan || Decision (Unanimous) || 2 || 2:00
|-  bgcolor="#cfc"
| 2013-04-14|| Win ||align=left| Kyo Kawakami ||Shoot Boxing Amateur Kansai || Kansai, Japan || Decision (Unanimous) || 2 || 2:00
|-  bgcolor="#cfc"
| 2013-02-24|| Win ||align=left| Ayumu Mita ||Shoot Boxing Amateur Kansai || Kansai, Japan || Ext.R Decision (Unanimous) || 3 || 2:00
|-  bgcolor="#fbb"
| 2013-01-27|| Loss ||align=left| Ryo Mandokoro ||NEXT LEVEL Kansai 4 || Sakai, Japan || Decision (Unanimous) || 2 ||
|-  bgcolor="#cfc"
| 2013-01-27|| Win||align=left| Naoki Asada ||NEXT LEVEL Kansai 4 || Sakai, Japan || TKO (Knee) || 2 ||
|-  bgcolor="#fbb"
| 2012-12-16|| Loss ||align=left| Ryo Mandokoro ||NEXT LEVEL Kansai 3 || Osaka, Japan || Decision (Majority) || 2 ||
|-  bgcolor="#fbb"
| 2012-07-16|| Loss ||align=left| Riku Kitani || NEXT LEVEL || Sakai, Japan || Decision (Unanimous) || 2 ||
|-  bgcolor="#cfc"
| 2012-05-20|| Win||align=left| Toma Maezono ||Shoot Boxing Osaka 2012 Alpinisme Young Caesar Cup Vol.2|| Osaka, Japan || Decision (Split) || 2 ||
|-  bgcolor="#cfc"
| 2012-05-06|| Win ||align=left| Yuka Sato || NEXT LEVEL || Osaka, Japan || Decision (Unanimous) || 2 ||
|-  bgcolor="#c5d2ea"
| 2012-03-25|| Draw ||align=left| Keisuke || NEXT LEVEL || Habikino, Japan || Decision ||  ||
|-  bgcolor="#cfc"
| 2012-03-25|| Win ||align=left| Yoshiho Tane || NEXT LEVEL || Habikino, Japan || Ext.R Decision (Unanimous) ||  || 
|-
| colspan=9 | Legend:

See also
List of male kickboxers

References

Living people
2001 births
Japanese male kickboxers
Sportspeople from Osaka